Fulford Harbour is a residential community on the southeast side of Salt Spring Island, British Columbia, located near the island's southern end. Fulford Harbour is the site of a BC Ferries terminal with regular ferry service to Swartz Bay on Vancouver Island.

See also
 Ganges, British Columbia

External links
 
 Fulford Harbour

Unincorporated settlements in British Columbia
Populated places in the Capital Regional District
Salt Spring Island